Tommaso Francesco Besozzi (20 January 1903 – 18 November 1964), also known as Tom, was an Italian journalist and writer. He is considered to be one of the most important post-war journalists of Italy and his writing style earned him the epithet "Hemingway of Europeo".

Early life
Born in Vigevano in Lombardy, northern Italy, in a rather affluent family, he was one of four children; one sister and two brothers, who both were killed in World War I. He studied at university, first mathematics in Bologna and later at the Faculty of Arts in Pavia.

Journalistic career

He started to work as a journalist for the Corriere della Sera in 1926 in Milan. In 1937 he reported from Ethiopia after the Italian invasion and occupation.

In 1947 he moved to the weekly magazine L'Europeo, for which he wrote important investigative reports. His style earned him the epithet “Hemingway of Europeo”.
Rumour has it that when Hemingway was asked in the 1950s if an Italian Hemingway existed, he said: “You also have one who writes like me: Tommaso Besozzi."

In February 1947 he wrote a historical article on the Istrian–Dalmatian exodus, when Italian citizens were leaving Pola, when the regions of Istria, Dalmatia, and Venezia Giulia, were handed over to Yugoslavia after the Paris Peace Treaty.

In 1948 he published an article in L'Europeo, showing the misery and hunger of the people of Africo, in the Aspromonte mountains, in Calabria.  The article, entitled "Africo, symbol of disparity", and the series of documentary photographs by Tino Petrelli produced an outrage from national public opinion which, at the time, was rediscovering the dramatic situation of the "southern question".

In July 1950, he wrote an article about the mysterious death of the Sicilian bandit Salvatore Giuliano, shot and killed in Castelvetrano. According to the police, Giuliano died resisting arrest. However, Besozzi soon exposed the official version as fiction. The headline of the article read: "The only thing certain is that he is dead." The article established his name and is often mentioned as one of the examples of investigative journalism in Italy.

In the 1950s he returned to Africa as a special correspondent for L'Europeo and Gente. His articles were later published in the book Il sogno del settimo viaggio (The dream of the seventh journey).

Death and legacy
Lonesome, victim of a writer’s block, he committed suicide with a homemade bomb on 18 November 1964 in Rome. He is considered to be one of the most important post-war journalists of Italy.

Bibliography
  Mannucci, Enrico (ed.) (1995). I giornali non sono scarpe. Tommaso Besozzi una vita da prima pagina. Baldini Castoldi Dalai, . 
  Mannucci, Enrico (ed) (1999). Tommaso Besozzi. Il sogno del settimo viaggio. Rome: Fazi,  .

References

Petacco, Arrigo (2005). A tragedy revealed: the story of the Italian population of Istria, Dalmatia, and Venezia Giulia, 1943-1956, University of Toronto Press,

External links
  Una biografia

1903 births
1964 deaths
Italian male journalists
20th-century Italian journalists
1964 suicides
20th-century Italian male writers
Suicides by explosive device
Suicides in Italy